The Tunis Metro (Tunis light metro, also Tunis light rail, el-metrū el-khfīf li-mdīnat tūnis) is an expanding public transportation network for the Tunis metropolitan area that was started in 1985. It is a light rail system.

Tunis Metro's light rail system has its track at a surface level generally with its rail bed, but at key intersections, the system goes underground to avoid congestion or has the right of way. Together with the TGM commuter rail line, it is managed by the parastatal transport authority Société des transports de Tunis (Transtu).

While many African cities once had traditional electric tram systems, all but the Alexandria Tram were discontinued. The Tunis Metro's modern light rail system was originally unique in Africa, but there are now modern trams in Algeria and Morocco, as well.

History

Tunis had an older electric tram system that, like in many cities, eventually was dismantled. With the post-war growth of the metropolitan area and the traffic congestion that followed, the need for a commuter transportation system became evident. The city eventually decided to link the suburbs to the city centre with a modern network of light rail. Preliminary studies were undertaken in 1974. The system was delivered as a turnkey operation by a consortium led by Siemens. The Société du métro léger de Tunis (SMLT) was founded in 1981 to manage the operation.

Public transport is overseen by Tunisia’s Ministry of Transport, with constituent bodies operating the various modes. The Société Nationale des Chemins de Fer Tunisiens (SNCFT) has continued development of the heavy rail standard and metre gauge routes, initiated under French control, with the  operation centred on Tunis.

Tunis is set on low-lying land around several lakes just inland from the Mediterranean Sea coast. The heart of the city, the Medina, has a street pattern that long pre-dates the industrial era or motorised transport. In 2003, the city’s road and rail public transport modes came together under the jurisdiction of the Société des Transports de Tunis, operating under the Transtu name.

As with most other large cities, road congestion is a feature of Tunis, although the challenge for public transport is as much about increasing the capacity of their already well-used services as it is about stemming the rise in car use.

Construction on Line 1 started in 1981, and passenger services commenced in 1985. In 1989, Line 2 was placed into operation, with Lines 3 and 4 following the next year. Line 5 became operative in 1992, while in the same year, Line 3 was extended to its current length. In 1997, the extension of Line 4 was inaugurated, and further construction for an extension to La Manouba was started in 2007. The Société des transports de Tunis took over management in 2003; it was formed by joining the SMLT and the Société nationale de transports (SNT, founded in 1963) that was responsible for the TGM railway. A new Line 6 was planned to link Tunis with El Mourouj and its construction began in 2005. This new line was completed in 2009. New Alstom Citadis trams to supplement the earlier Siemens trams were introduced in 2007.

Network

Line 1  

Place de Barcelone – Ben Arous
Opened: 1985
Number of stations: 11 

Line 1 is the oldest and it is the shortest line compared to the 5 other lines. It has 11 stations.

Work on line 1, which began in 1981, was completed with the commissioning of the line (towards Ben Arous) in 1985.

The connection between bus lines and line 1 at the El Ouardia station was put in place a year later, in 1986.

Line 2 

Place de la République – Ariana
Opened: 1989
Number of stations: 12 

Line 2 is the oldest and it is the shortest line after Line 1. It has 12 stations. Construction on Line 2 started in 1981 and passenger services commenced in 1989.

Line 3 

Tunis Marine – Ibn Khaldoun
Opened: 1990
Number of stations: 14 

Line 3 is composed of 14 stations and passenger services commenced in 1990. In 2017, the Tunis Transport Company announced the removal of the Habib-Thameur station following a fire that destroyed the ticket sales point.

The station of Tunis Marine has also a line of TGM. It's the only station that is both a Metro station and a TGM station.

Line 4 

Place de Barcelone – Kheireddine
Opened: 1990
Number of stations: 20 

Line 4 is the longest compared to the other 5 lines. It has 20 stations and passenger services commenced in 1990.

Line 5 

Place de Barcelone – Intilaka
Opened: 1992
Number of stations: 14 

Line 5 has 14 stations since 2017 after a fire that burned the Habib-Thameur station.

The line links important locations such as the campus of the University of El Manar and Bab Saadoun.

Line 6 

Place de Barcelone – Intilaka
Opened: 2008
Number of stations: 18 

Line 6 has 18 stations and is the longest line after line 4. On 12 November 2008, the new line 6 (6.8 kilometers long and initially serving eleven stations between Place de Barcelona and El Mourouj 4) came into service after work on the line had started in 2005.  Like line 3, line 6 has a TGM line in Tunis Marine station.

Infrastructure 

With the city set for continuing population growth, preliminary studies for light rail, the Métro Léger, began in 1974. A Siemens-led consortium won the contract to create the 1,435mm, overhead supply surface network. Line 1, Tunis Marine (also the city terminus for the TGM) to Ben Arous in the south, opened in 1985.

Tram vehicles 

By 2006, 136 articulated passenger trams were in operation. They were built by Siemens and delivered between 1984 and 1997. These trams were derived from the TW 6000 originally developed for Hanover Stadtbahn. The bi-directional trams are powered via a 750 V dc overhead wire and run on a  track. The trams have a green livery with white and blue lines. Each tram consists of two units each of which has:
 bogies typ Bo-2-2-Bo
 electric motors 2 x 240 kW
 weight of 40.3 tonnes
 length of 30 meters
 width of 2.47 meters
 access from low and high platforms

In 2004, an agreement between the French and Tunisian governments led to the order of 30 new Alstom Citadis trams. Each tram consists of two units 64 metres in length and can hold 208 people standing and 58 sitting places. The first such trams started to operate on 17 September 2007. 16 more trams were ordered from Alstom in July 2010.

See also

 List of Tunis Metro stations
 List of town tramway systems in Africa
 Réseau Ferroviaire Rapide
 Transport in Tunisia

References

External links

 Official site of the Société des transports de Tunis 

Rapid transit in Tunisia
Tram transport in Tunisia
Tunis
750 V DC railway electrification
Railway lines opened in 1985